Wolverhampton Wanderers Football Club is an English football club based in Wolverhampton. The club was founded as St Luke's in 1877, soon becoming Wolverhampton Wanderers, before being a founder member of the Football League in 1888. Since that time, the club has played in all four professional divisions of the English football pyramid, and been champions of all these levels. They have also been involved in European football, having been one of the first English clubs to enter the European Cup, as well as reaching the final of the first staging of the UEFA Cup.

This list encompasses all honours won by Wolverhampton Wanderers and records set by the club, their managers and their players. The player records section includes details of the club's leading goalscorers and those who have made most appearances in first-team competitions, as well as transfer fee records paid and received by the club. A list of streaks recording all elements of the game (wins, losses, clean sheets, etc.) is also presented.

Honours
In the all-time top flight league table since the league's inception in 1888, Wolves sit in the top fifteen, in terms of all-time English first level league position.

Alternatively, they sit in the top four, behind only Manchester United, Liverpool and Arsenal in terms of all-time league position from points gained at any level of English professional football.

Cumulatively, they are the joint 11th most successful club in domestic English football history, tied with Nottingham Forest. One place behind Blackburn Rovers, with nine major trophy wins, not including super cups. Alternatively they are joint 10th with Nottingham Forrest, in competitive honours with 13 trophy wins, behind Newcastle United.(see here).

Uniquely, they are the only club to have won titles in five different Football League divisions, and, in 1988, became the first team to have been champions of all four professional leagues in English football; although this feat has since been matched by Burnley (in 1992) and Preston (in 1996). They remain the only club to have won all the main domestic cup competitions (FA Cup, League Cup and EFL Trophy) currently contested in English football.

League
First Division/Premier League
Champions: 1953–54, 1957–58, 1958–59
Runners-up: 1937–38, 1938–39, 1949–50, 1954–55, 1959–60

Second Division/Championship
Champions: 1931–32, 1976–77, 2008–09, 2017–18
Runners-up: 1966–67, 1982–83
Play-off winners: 2003

Third Division/League One
Champions: 1923–24 (North), 1988–89, 2013–14

Fourth Division
Champions: 1987–88

Cup
UEFA Cup
Runners-up: 1972
FA Cup
Winners: 1893, 1908, 1949, 1960
Runners-up: 1889, 1896, 1921, 1939

EFL Cup
Winners: 1974, 1980

FA Charity Shield
Winners: 1949*, 1954*, 1959, 1960* (* joint holders)
Runners-up: 1958

EFL Trophy
Winners: 1988

Texaco Cup
Winners: 1971

Minor honours

Premier League Asia Trophy
Winners: 2019

Uhrencup
Winners: 2018

Football League War Cup
Winners: 1942

FA Youth Cup
Winners: 1958
Runners-up: 1953, 1954, 1962, 1976

United Soccer Association
Champions 1967 – playing as Los Angeles Wolves

NASL International Cup
Winners 1969 – playing as Kansas City Spurs

Premier League 2 Division 2
Winners 2018-19

The Central League
Winners 1931–32, 1950–51, 1951–52, 1952–53, 1957–58, 1958–59

Birmingham Senior Cup
Winners 1891–92, 1892–93, 1893–94, 1899–1900, 1901–02, 1923–24, 1986–87
Runners-up 1888–89, 1896–97, 1897–98, 1903–04, 1906–07, 1908–09, 1912–13, 1998–99, 2003–04, 2016–17

Birmingham Football Combination
Winners 1934–35

Birmingham & District League
Winners 1892–93, 1897–98, 1898–99, 1900–01, 1953–54, 1957–58, 1958–59

Worcestershire Football Combination
Winners 1957–58

Staffordshire Senior Cup
Winners 1887–88, 1893–94, 1966–67
Runners Up 1884–85

Shropshire Senior Cup
Winners 2001

Walsall Senior Cup
Runners Up 1885–86

Wrekin Cup
Winners 1884 (First ever trophy)

Daily Express National Five-a-Sides
 Winners 1975, 1976

Gothia Cup
Winners 2009

Players

Appearances 
Most appearances
Note: Competitive first-team games only; substitute appearances are included in total.

 Most League appearances: 501 – Derek Parkin (1968–1982)
 Most FA Cup appearances: 48 – Harry Wood (1885–1898) and Billy Wright (1939–1959)
 Most League Cup appearances: 36 – Kenny Hibbitt (1968–1984)
 Most European appearances: 18 – Derek Dougan (1967–1975)
 Most consecutive appearances: 171 – Phil Parkes (127 league), September 1970 to September 1973
 Youngest player: Jimmy Mullen, 16 years 43 days (vs Leeds United, 18 February 1939)
 Oldest player: Archie Goodall, 41 years 116 days (vs Everton, Division 1; 2 December 1905)

Goalscorers 
Highest goalscorers
Note: Goals scored in competitive first-team games only

 Most goals in a season in all competitions: 52 – Steve Bull (1987–88, Division 4)
 Most League goals in a season: 38 – Dennis Westcott (1946–47, Division 1)
 Most top flight goals scored: 158 – Johnny Hancocks (1946–57)
 Most Premier League goals scored: 36 – Raúl Jiménez (as of 3 November 2021)
 Most goals in European competition: 12 – Derek Dougan (1967–75)
 Most hat-tricks scored: 18 – Steve Bull (1986–99)
 Most goals scored in a match: 5
 Joe Butcher vs Accrington, 19 November 1892 (Division 1)
 Tom Phillipson vs Bradford City, 25 December 1926 (Division 2)
 Billy Hartill vs Notts County, 12 October 1929 (Division 2)
 Billy Hartill vs Aston Villa, 3 September 1934 (Division 1)
 Fastest recorded goal: 15 seconds – John Richards vs Burnley, 15 November 1975

Internationals
 First international: Charlie Mason for England vs Ireland, 17 March 1884
 Most international caps received whilst signed to Wolves: Billy Wright – 105 for England (1939–59)
 Most international goals scored whilst signed to Wolves: 10 – Ron Flowers and Dennis Wilshaw (both England)
 Most World Cup Finals appearances whilst signed to Wolves: 10 – Billy Wright (England, 1950–58)

Award winners
Football Writers' Footballer of the Year
 Billy Wright – 1952
 Bill Slater – 1960

Transfers
 Highest fee paid: £38 million to Sporting CP for Matheus Nunes, August 2022.
 Highest fee received: £41 million from Liverpool for Diogo Jota, September 2020.

Progression of record fee paid

Progression of record fee sold

Managers

 Longest-serving manager: Jack Addenbrooke – 36 years, 10 months
 Shortest-serving manager: Bill McGarry (second spell) – 61 days
 Youngest manager when appointed: Jack Addenbrooke – 20 years old
 Oldest manager when appointed: Bill McGarry (second spell) – 58 years old

Team records

Matches
Firsts
 First known match: St Luke's 0–8 Stafford Road, 13 January 1877
 First FA Cup match: Wolves 4–1 Long Eaton Rangers, 1st round, 27 October 1883
 First Football League match: Wolves 1–1 Aston Villa, 8 September 1888
 First match at Molineux: Wolves 1–0 Aston Villa, friendly, 2 September 1889
 First European match: Wolves 2–2 Schalke, European Cup 2nd round 1st leg, 12 November 1958
 First League Cup match: Wolves 2–1 Mansfield Town, 2nd round, 13 September 1966

Record wins
 Record win: 14–0 vs Crosswell's Brewery, FA Cup 2nd round, 13 November 1886
 Record League win: 10–1 vs Leicester City, Division 1, 15 April 1938
 Record FA Cup win: 14–0 vs Crosswell's Brewery, FA Cup 2nd round, 13 November 1886
 Record League Cup win: 6–1 vs Shrewsbury Town, 2nd round 1st leg, 24 September 1991
 Record European win: 5–0 vs Austria Vienna, European Cup Winners' Cup quarter-final 2nd leg, 30 November 1960
 Record home win (league): 10–1 vs Leicester City, Division 1, 15 April 1938
 Record home win (cup): 14–0 vs Crosswell's Brewery, FA Cup 2nd round, 13 November 1886
 Record away win (league): 9–1 vs Cardiff City, Division 1, 3 September 1955
 Record away win (cup): 5–0 vs Grimsby Town, FA Cup semi-final, 25 March 1939 (neutral venue)

Record defeats
 Record defeat: 1–10 vs Newton Heath, Division 1, 15 October 1892
 Record League defeat: 1–10 vs Newton Heath, Division 1, 15 October 1892
 Record FA Cup defeat: 0–6 vs Rotherham United, 1st round, 16 November 1985
 Record League Cup defeat: 0–6 vs Chelsea, 3rd round, 25 September 2012
 Record European defeat: 0–4 vs Barcelona, European Cup 2nd round first leg, 10 February 1960
 Record home defeat (league): 0–8 vs West Bromwich Albion, Division 1, 27 December 1897
 Record home defeat (cup): 3–6 vs Derby County, FA Cup 3rd round, 14 January 1933
 Record away defeat (league): 1–10 vs Newton Heath, Division 1, 15 October 1892
 Record away defeat (cup): 0–6 vs Rotherham United, FA Cup 1st round, 16 November 1985; and vs Chelsea, League Cup 3rd round, 25 September 2012

Streaks

Note: Applies to League games only

 Longest run of consecutive full seasons playing in Tier 1 of English football: 26 (1932 – 1965) [n.b. 1939–40 season was abandoned due to outbreak of World War II and there was no full league football between 1940 and 1946 due to the conflict]
 Longest run of consecutive full seasons playing in Tier 2 of English football: 14 (1989 – 2003)
 Longest unbeaten run: 21 games (January – August 2005)
 Longest unbeaten run in home games: 27 games (March 1923 – September 1924)
 Longest unbeaten run in away games: 11 games (September 1953 – January 1954)
 Longest winning run: 9 games (January – March 2014)
 Longest winning run in home games: 14 games (March – December 1953)
 Longest winning run in away games: 5 games (during 1938, 1962, 1980, 2001, 2013)
 Longest winless run: 19 games (December 1984 – April 1985)
 Longest winless run in home games: 13 games (November 1984 – May 1985)
 Longest winless run in away games: 32 games (March 1922 – October 1923)
 Longest scoring run: 41 games (December 1958 – December 1959)
 Longest scoreless run: 7 games (February – March 1985)
 Longest run of clean sheets: 8 games (August – October 1982)
 Longest run without a clean sheet: 30 games (September 2011 – April 2012)

Goals
 Most league goals scored in a season: 115 (Division 2; 1931–32)
 Fewest league goals scored in a season: 27 (Division 1; 1983–84)
 Most league goals conceded in a season: 99 (Division 1; 1905–06)
 Fewest league goals conceded in a season: 27 (Division 3; 1923–24)
 Most goals scored in a game (league): 10 (vs Leicester City, Division 1, 15 April 1938)
 Most goals scored in a game (cup): 14 (vs Crosswell's Brewery, FA Cup 2nd round, 13 November 1886)

Points
 Most points in a season:
 Two points for a win: 64 (Division 1, 1957–58)
 Three points for a win: 103 (League One, 2013–14)
 Fewest points in a season:
 Two points for a win: 21 (Division 1, 1895–96)
 Three points for a win: 25 (Premier League, 2011–12)

Attendances
 Highest home attendance: 61,315 vs Liverpool, FA Cup 4th Round, 11 February 1939
 Highest league attendance: 58,661 vs West Bromwich Albion, Division 1, 15 October 1949
 Highest average league attendance: 45,346 (1949–50 season)

Season-by-season performance

Miscellaneous feats
 Wolves were awarded, and scored from, the Football League's first ever penalty kick on 14 September 1891.
 Wolves were the first (and as of 2014 only) English league team to pass the 100-goal mark for four seasons in succession, in the 1957–58, 1958–59, 1959–60 and 1960–61 seasons.
 In 2005 Wolves became the first team to have scored 7,000 league goals and currently trail only Manchester United and Liverpool in terms of total league goals (as of the end of the 2016–17 season).

References

Records and Statistics
Wolverhampton Wanderers